Mierea may refer to several villages in Romania:

 Mierea, a village in Vernești Commune, Buzău County
 Mierea, a village in Crușeț Commune, Gorj County
 Mierea, a village in Ghioroiu Commune, Vâlcea County